Sar Gol or Sargol may refer to:

Sar Gol, Hormozgan
Sar Gol, Sistan and Baluchestan
Sar Gol, Tehran